Huntsville City Schools is the school district serving Huntsville, Alabama. As of the 2016–17 school year, the system had 24,083 students and employed 1,697 teachers. The district oversees 36 schools: 21 PreK-elementary schools, 6 middle schools, 7 high schools, and 2 magnet schools.

The school system finished the 2010 fiscal year with a debt of nearly $20 million the largest of any school system in Alabama by a significant margin. However, after Casey Wardynski was appointed superintendent, he worked to erase the school system's debt and bring the budget into surplus.

It is partially within Madison County, and partially in Limestone County.

History

In 2014 officials from the school district began monitoring social media activity from students. The officials stated that a phone call from the National Security Agency (NSA) prompted them to do so. In the 2013 fiscal year it paid Chris McRae, a former agent of the Federal Bureau of Investigation (FBI), to run this program.

Elementary schools

Academy for Academics and Arts (magnet)
Academy for Science and Foreign Language (magnet)
Blossomwood Elementary
Chaffee Elementary
Challenger Elementary
Chapman P-8
Dawson Elementary
Farley Elementary
GoldSmith Shiffman Elementary

Hampton Cove Elementary
Hereford Elementary
Highlands Elementary
Jones Valley Elementary
Lakewood Elementary
Martin Luther King Jr. Elementary
McDonnell Elementary
Monte Sano Elementary
Montview

Morris Elementary
Mountain Gap P-8
Providence Elementary
Ridgecrest Elementary
Rolling Hills Elementary
Weatherly Heights Elementary
Williams P-8

Middle schools

Academy for Academics and Arts (magnet)
Academy for Science and Foreign Language (magnet)
Challenger Middle
Chapman P-8

Hampton Cove Middle
Huntsville Middle
McNair Jr. High School
Mountain Gap P-8

Whitesburg Middle
Williams P-8

High schools

Columbia High School
Virgil I. Grissom High School
Huntsville High School

Jemison High School 
Lee High School
New Century Technology High School

Others
Community Intensive Treatment for Youth (C.I.T.Y.) (alternative school)
Huntsville Center for Technology (vocational school)

Failing schools
Statewide testing ranks the schools in Alabama. Those in the bottom six percent are listed as "failing." As of early 2018, three local schools were included in this category:
 Mae Jemison High School
 Lee High School
 Ronald McNair 7-8

Former Schools 

 J.O. Johnson High School
 S.R. Butler High School
 R.L. Stone Middle School
 Terry Heights Elementary School
 Fletcher E. Seldon Center
 Ed White Middle School
 Davis Hills Middle School

Board of Education

District 1 - North Huntsville (Currently held by Michelle Watkins)
District 2 - East Huntsville (Currently held by Beth Wilder, 2nd Vice President of the School Board)
District 3 - South Huntsville (Currently held by Elisa Ferrell, President of the School Board)
District 4 - Downtown Huntsville (Currently held by Walker McGinnis, 1st Vice President of the School Board)
District 5 - West Huntsville (Currently held by Carlos Matthews)

Revitalization
Currently, a major overhaul of the cities school facilities and curriculum is occurring. In 2012, a new digital curriculum was issued, giving all students laptops and increasing digital usage for teaching. This was done to take advantage of the growing use of computers and to help give students easy access to information and organization. In 2011, a $194 million five year capital plan was granted by the Alabama Board of Education to the Huntsville City School System. With this, the city plans to renovate and construct new facilities for many of its aging campuses. These include a new Blossomwood Elementary School, New Freshman Academy for Huntsville High School, construction of a new building and campus for the combination of Lee High School and New Century Technological School, construction of a new Whitesburg Elementary, Virgil I. Grissom High School (the cities largest student body), and J. O. Johnson High School. Renovations and consolidations for many other of the cities schools is also planned.

References

External links

Huntsville City Schools website
"Demographer recommends closing nine Huntsville public schools" in The Huntsville Times, 2011

Education in Huntsville, Alabama
School districts in Alabama
Education in Madison County, Alabama
Education in Limestone County, Alabama